The  Ha'penny Bridge (or Droichead na Life), known later for a time as the Penny Ha'penny Bridge, and officially the Liffey Bridge, is a pedestrian bridge built in May 1816 over the River Liffey in Dublin, Ireland.  Made of cast iron, the bridge was cast in Shropshire, England.

Name 

Originally called the Wellington Bridge (after the Dublin-born Duke of Wellington), the name of the bridge was changed to Liffey Bridge after the Irish War of Independence in 1922. The Liffey Bridge remains the bridge's official name to this day, although it is most commonly referred to as the Ha'penny Bridge.

History

Before the Ha'penny Bridge was built there were seven ferries, operated by a William Walsh, across the Liffey. The ferries were in a bad condition and Walsh was informed that he had to either fix them or build a bridge. Walsh chose the latter option and was granted the right to extract a ha'penny toll from anyone crossing it for 100 years.

Initially the toll charge was based not on the cost of construction, but to match the charges levied by the ferries it replaced. A further condition of construction was that, if the citizens of Dublin found the bridge and toll to be "objectionable" within its first year of operation, it was to be removed at no cost to the city.

The toll was increased for a time to a penny-ha'penny (1½ pence), but was eventually dropped in 1919. While the toll was in operation, there were turnstiles at either end of the bridge.

The manufacture of the bridge was commissioned by the then Lord Mayor of Dublin, John Claudius Beresford with the Coalbrookdale Company of England. Using ore originally mined in County Leitrim's Sliabh an Iarainn, the bridge's cast iron ribs were made in 18 sections and then shipped to Dublin. The design and erection was supervised by John Windsor, one of the company's foremen and a pattern-maker.

Renovation and maintenance
In 2001 the number of pedestrians using the bridge on a daily basis was 27,000 and, given these traffic levels, a structural survey indicated that renovation was required. The bridge was closed for repair and renovations during 2001 and was reopened in December 2001, sporting its original white colour.

The structure was rebuilt to retain many of its old components, although, controversially, some features were removed. The repair work was carried out by Harland and Wolff.

In 2012, citing a maintenance and damage risk, Dublin City Council removed a number of love locks from the Ha'penny Bridge and nearby Millennium Bridge, and asked people not to add any more. In 2013 the council removed over 300 kg of locks from the bridge, and signage was added asking people not to put padlocks on the bridge.

On 19 May 2016, the bicentenary of the bridge was celebrated with a symbolic procession over the bridge involving the current Lord Mayor, Críona Ní Dhálaigh, descendants of J.C. Beresford and of John Windsor from England.

References

External links 
Ha'penny Bridge entry on Dublin City Council's Bridges of Dublin web site

Bridges in Dublin (city)
Bridges completed in 1816
Pedestrian bridges in the Republic of Ireland
Cast-iron arch bridges in Ireland
Former toll bridges in Ireland
1816 establishments in Ireland